Marduk-zâkir-šumi, inscribed mdAMAR.UTU-za-kir-MU in a reconstruction of two kinglists, “Marduk pronounced the name,” was a king of Babylon from 855 to 819 BC during the mixed dynastic period referred to in antiquity as the dynasty of E. He was a contemporary of the Assyrian kings, Salmānu-ašarēdu III) (commonly known as Shalmaneser III) (859–824 BC) and Šamši-Adad V (824–811 BC) with whom he was allied.

Biography

There are few contemporary inscriptions bearing witness to his reign. A kudurru granting Ibni-Ištar, a kalû-priest of the temple of Eanna in Uruk, land by Marduk-zâkir-šumi, is dated to his second year. Nazi-Enlil was governor or šandabakku (inscribed LÚGÚ.EN.NA) of Nippur, the first appearance of this office since Kassite times, as he appears as a witness along with the crown prince, Marduk-balāssu-iqbi. A second kudurru records a private land sale near Dilbat. His son, Enlil-apla-uṣur, was to succeed him in Marduk-balāssu-iqbi’s reign. A lapis lazuli seal of this king depicting Marduk's statue resting on his pet dragon, Mušḫuššu, was an offering intended to be hung around an idol's neck.

Marduk-bēl-ušati’s revolt

His younger brother, Marduk-bēl-ušati (inscribed mdAMAR.UTU-EN-ú-sat), rebelled and established a brief regime in the Diyāla region, seizing Daban. Assyrian sources describe him as šar ḫammā’i, "usurper." During years 851 and 850 BC, the Assyrian king Salmānu-ašarēdu III came to Marduk-zâkir-šumi‘s aid (ana nīrārūtišu) and campaigned in concert to force him to flee to the Jasubu mountainous region northeast, area of lower Diyāla. During the first of the campaigns, Marduk-bēl-ušati made a stand at Ganannate but was defeated outside the city walls. He was able to take refuge within the city which remained unconquered. The second campaign resulted in the city’s fall and he beat a hasty retreat with some of his officers, escaping "like a fox through a hole" to the city of Arman (Ḫalman) which itself was taken after a siege. Salmānu-ašarēdu left an account of these events on his Black Obelisk:

During his campaign, Salmānu-ašarēdu captured the city of Baqani, extracting tribute from Adini of Bit-Dakkuri, also from Mušallim-Marduk of the Amukani and the leader of the Yakin tribes, the earliest attestation of these Chaldean groups and made a pilgrimage to Babylon where he recounted "I ascended to Esagila, the palace of the gods, the abode of the king of all …" He practiced his religious devotions at other cultic shrines as his Black Obelisk recalls “I went to the great urban centers. I made sacrifices in Babylon, Borsippa and Kutha.” A relief from the front of his throne base depicts him gripping Marduk-zâkir-šumi’s hand in a public display of Assyro-Babylonian friendship. The kings are flanked by beardless youths identified as the crown princes and presumed to be Šamši-Adad V and Marduk-balāssu-iqbi, who would eventually come to conflict.

Babylonian intervention in the Assyrian succession

The opportunity came for Marduk-zâkir-šumi to return the favor when, in his 32nd year of rule, c. 826 BC, Salmānu-ašarēdu's own son, Aššur-danin-apli ("Aššur has strengthened the son") rebelled against his father. Šamši-Adad V recalled:

The Synchronistic History remains curiously silent on these events, but a treaty between Šamši-Adad and Marduk-zâkir-šumi seems to place the Assyrian in an inferior position, indicative of his reliance on and debt to the Babylonian king. It concludes with a series of curses apparently copied from the Code of Hammurabi and notably omitting the god Aššur:

It may well have been concluded while Salmānu-ašarēdu was still alive and been accompanied by the diplomatic marriage of Marduk-zâkir-šumi's daughter, Shammuramat, the inspiration for the legend of Semiramis, to Šamši-Adad. The consequences were, however, that Šamši-Adad resented his subordinate position and came to wreak a terrible revenge during the reign of Marduk-zâkir-šumi's son and heir, Marduk-balāssu-iqbi.

See also

Marduk-zakir-šumi I kudurru

Inscriptions

ABC Assyrian and Babylonian Chronicles (Grayson, 1975); AfO Archiv für Orientforschungen; AO siglum of objects in the collection of the Musée du Louvre; BM Department of Western Asiatic Antiquities, British Museum; IM National Museum of Iraq (Baghdad); K. Kouyunjik collection, British Museum; Rm Rassam collection, British Museum; KAV Keilschrifttexte aus Assur verschiedenen (Schroeder, 1920); ND prefix of field numbers, excavations at Nimrud 1949–63; RA Revue d'Assyriologie; SAA State Archives of Assyria; VA Vorderasiatische Abetilung, Vorderasiatisches Museum Berlin; VAT Vorderasiatische Abetilung, Tontafel, siglum of tablets in Vorderasiatisches wing of the Pergamon Museum, Berlin; VS Vorderasiatische Schriftdenkmäler (Ungnad, 1907).

Notes

External links
Kuddurru of the Babylonian King Marduk-Zakir-Shumi, Iran, Late Assyrian Period, circa 850 BC baghdadmuseum.org. 2006. Retrieved on 2009-09-07.

References

9th-century BC Babylonian kings
9th-century BC rulers